The Roman Catholic Diocese of Concepción is in Argentina and is a suffragan of the Archdiocese of Tucumán.

History
On 12 August 1963 Saint John XXIII founded the Diocese of Concepción from territory taken from the Archdiocese of Tucumán.

Bishops

Ordinaries
Juan Carlos Ferro (1963–1980)
Jorge Arturo Meinvielle, S.D.B. (1980–1991), appointed Bishop of San Justo
Bernardo Enrique Witte, O.M.I. (1992–2001)
Armando José María Rossi, O.P. (2001–2020)
José Melitón Chávez (2020–2021)
José Antonio Díaz (2021–present)

Coadjutor bishops
Armando José María Rossi, O.P. (2000–2001)
José Melitón Chávez (2019–2020)

References

Roman Catholic dioceses in Argentina
Roman Catholic Ecclesiastical Province of Tucumán
Christian organizations established in 1963
Roman Catholic dioceses and prelatures established in the 20th century